The stanhope was a gig, buggy, or light phaeton, typically having a high seat for one person and closed back. It was named after Captain Hon. Henry FitzRoy Stanhope (ca. 1754 - 1828, son of William Stanhope, 2nd Earl of Harrington), a well-known sportsman of his time, and built by the London firm of Tilbury, coachbuilders in Mount Street. (see Tilbury (carriage))

See also
 Stanhope, an early auto body
 Types of carriages

References

External links
D7849 Stanhope gig, wood, maker unknown, England, c 1862 - Powerhouse Museum Collection. Powerhouse Museum | Science + Design | Sydney Australia. Search "stanhope gig".
Morven Park Morven Park Winmill Carriage Museum
Seabrook Coaching Stable Dispersal Auction: Stanhope Gig. The Carriage Association of America, Inc.

Carriages